The Russian occupation of Kherson Oblast is an ongoing military occupation of Ukraine's Kherson Oblast by Russian forces that began on 2March 2022 during the Russian invasion of Ukraine as part of the southern Ukraine campaign. The Russian-installed occupation regime was first called the "Kherson military-civilian administration", and then "Kherson Oblast" after the Russian annexation.

Russia captured the city of Kherson 2 March 2022, which is the capital city of the oblast and therefore politically important. Most of the rest of Kherson Oblast fell to Russian forces in the early months of the invasion. Kherson was the only regional capital that Russia managed to capture in the 2022 invasion, although the cities of Donetsk and Luhansk had already been controlled by Russian-backed separatists since 2014. From 29 August to 11 November 2022, Kherson Oblast, especially the area surrounding the city of Kherson, was the center of the 2022 Kherson counteroffensive.

In May 2022, Russia declared its intention to annex Kherson Oblast. In September 2022, Russian forces in the oblast held disputed referendums to support the annexation. On 30 September 2022, Russia declared that it had annexed Kherson Oblast, including parts of the oblast that it did not control at the time. At the same time (30 September 2022), Russia declared that two small areas of Mykolaiv Oblast that it controlled at the time, the city of Snihurivka and its surroundings, as well as the outer portion of the Kinburn Peninsula, had been annexed into Kherson Oblast. On 12 October 2022, the United Nations General Assembly passed a resolution calling on countries not to recognise what it described as an "attempted illegal annexation" and demanded that Russia "immediately, completely and unconditionally withdraw".

On 19 October 2022, the Russian administration's executive bodies moved from the city of Kherson to the left bank of the Dnieper River as part of an evacuation. On 3 November 2022, nine months after the battle of Kherson had ended, Russian forces removed their flag from the city's administrative building and advised people still living in the city to leave and cross the river to the southern bank. On 9 November 2022, Russia withdrew from the city of Kherson, which was followed by the liberation of Kherson on 11 November 2022. Amidst the withdrawal from the west of Kherson Oblast, the Russians also withdrew from Snihurivka and its surroundings in Mykolaiv Oblast (on 10 November 2022).

After the loss of Kherson, the administrative centre of the Russian occupation forces is now Henichesk. Russia continues to assert its claim to the rest of the oblast.

Background 
On 24 February, Russian forces began an invasion of Ukraine. Fighting began across the Kherson Oblast, resulting in multiple Russian victories. On 2 March, Russian forces captured the capital of the oblast, Kherson, beginning a military occupation of the city and the oblast.

Military occupation 

Shortly after Kherson was captured, the Russian Ministry of Defence said talks between Russian forces and city administrators regarding the maintenance of order were underway. An agreement was reached in which the Ukrainian flag would still be hoisted in the city while Russia established the new administration. Mayor Ihor Kolykhaiev announced new conditions for the city's residents: citizens could only go outside during daytime and were forbidden to gather in groups. Additionally, cars were only allowed to enter the city to supply food and medicine; these vehicles were to drive at minimum speeds and were subject to searches. Citizens were warned not to provoke Russian soldiers and obey any commands given.

In the first days of the invasion, Russian forces established control over and unblocked the North Crimean Canal, effectively rescinding a longstanding water blockage imposed on Crimea by Ukraine after the 2014 Russian annexation of the peninsula.

Initial allegations that Russian soldiers had raped 11 women in Kherson, and that six of those women were killed, including a teenager, were denied by Hennadiy Lahuta, head of the Ukrainian Kherson Regional State Administration, who stated that such reports were disinformation.

On 5 March, Kolykhaiev said that there was no armed resistance in the city and Russian troops were "quite settled". He requested humanitarian aid, stating that the city lacked power, water, and medicine. Later that day, around 2,000 protesters marched in the city center. The protesters waved Ukrainian flags, sang the national anthem, and chanted patriotic slogans. A video showed Russian soldiers firing into the air to dissuade the protestors. There were also claims that the Russian force had a list of Ukrainian activists in the city that they wanted to capture. On 9 March, the General Staff of the Ukrainian Armed Forces stated that Russia had detained more than 400 people in Kherson due to ongoing protests.

On 12 March, Ukrainian officials claimed that Russia was planning to stage a referendum in Kherson to establish the Kherson People's Republic, similar to the Donetsk People's Republic and the Luhansk People's Republic. , deputy leader of the Kherson Oblast Council, claimed that the Russian military had called all the members of the council and asked them to cooperate. Lyudmyla Denisova, Ombudsman of Ukraine, stated that the referendum would be illegal because "under Ukrainian law any issues over territory can only be resolved by a nationwide referendum". Later that day, the Kherson Oblast Council passed a resolution stating that the proposed referendum would be illegal.

On 13 March, Ukrayinska Pravda, a Ukrainian newspaper, reported that several thousand people in Kherson took part in a protest. Russian soldiers dispersed the protest with gunfire, stun grenades, and rubber bullets, injuring several people.

On 22 March, the Ukrainian government warned Kherson was facing a "humanitarian catastrophe" as the city was running out of food and medical supplies and accused Russia of blocking evacuation of civilians to Ukraine-controlled territory. Russia countered by saying that its military helped deliver aid to the city's population. A local journalist stated that there was only a staged event, in which former prisoners from Crimea were brought in to act as locals welcoming the Russians and accepting their assistance. According to several media outlets, residents report intrusive checkpoints, abductions, and Russian looting of shops.

Military-civilian administration 

By the beginning of April, Russian flags began to be displayed in Kherson Oblast.

On 18 April, Igor Kastyukevich, a Russian politician and deputy of the 8th State Duma, was allegedly appointed by the Russian government as a de facto mayor for Russian forces on 2 March. Kastyukevich denied these reports.

On 25 April 2022, Ihor Kolykhaiev announced that Russian forces had taken control of the Kherson City Council building.

On 26 April, both local authorities and Russian state media reported that Russian troops had taken over the city's administration headquarters and had appointed a new mayor, former KGB agent Oleksandr Kobets, and a new civilian-military regional administrator, ex-mayor Volodymyr Saldo. The next day, Ukraine's Prosecutor General said that troops used tear gas and stun grenades to disperse a pro-Ukraine protest in the city centre.

In an indication of an intended split from Ukraine, on 28 April the new military-civilian administration announced that from May it would switch the region's currency to the Russian ruble. Additionally, citing unnamed reports that alleged discrimination against Russian speakers, its deputy head, Kirill Stremousov said that "reintegrating the Kherson region back into a Nazi Ukraine is out of the question".

On 27 April, the Legislative Assembly of Krasnoyarsk Krai in Siberia approved the expropriation of grain from the Kherson region. Agricultural machinery from the occupied Kherson region was also transported to remote Russian lands, including Chechnya. Lyudmila Denisova, the Ukrainian Parliament Commissioner for Human Rights, has compared this to repeating the Holodomor, a famine in Soviet Ukraine in 1932-1933 that killed millions of Ukrainians.

On 29 April, Saldo stated that the official languages of the Kherson Oblast would be both Ukrainian and Russian and that the International Settlements Bank from South Ossetia would open 200 branches in Kherson Oblast soon.

On 1 May, a four-month plan was adopted for a full transition to rubles. At the same time, the Ukrainian hryvnia was to remain the current currency along with the ruble for four months.

On 7 May, a new coat of arms was adopted, based on the 1803 coat of arms of Kherson of the Russian Empire.

On 9 May, an Immortal Regiment event took place in the city, celebrating Victory Day. Soviet-era victory flags and red banners were flown.

On 11 May 2022, Kirill Stremousov announced his readiness to send President Vladimir Putin with a request for Kherson Oblast to join the Russian Federation, noting that there would be no creation of the "Kherson People's Republic" or referendums regarding this matter. Commenting on these statements, Putin's press secretary Dmitry Peskov said that this issue should be decided by the inhabitants of the region and that "these fateful decisions must have an absolutely clear legal background, legal justification, be absolutely legitimate, as was the case with Crimea".

On 30 May, Russia claimed that it had started exporting last year's grain from Kherson to Russia. They were also working on exporting sunflower seeds. According to locals, Russian soldiers were being employed as strawberry pickers in Kherson Oblast.

On 3 June, the EU stated that it wouldn't recognize any Russian passports issued to Ukrainian citizens in the Kherson and Zaporizhzhia regions. On 11 June, according to local officials, the first Russian passports were handed out to citizens in Kherson and Zaporizhzhia Region, including local officials such as Volodymyr Saldo.

On 21 July, it was reported that a then-recent Russian decree had extended Russian 2022 war censorship laws to the Kherson oblast, with deportation to Russia included as a punishment for infringement.

According to Ukrainian authorities, at the beginning of July, People's Deputy of Ukraine Oleksii Kovalov assumed the position of deputy head of the government of Kherson Oblast. Kovalov was shot dead in his own home on 29 August 2022.

Deputy head of the Kherson Military-Civilian Administration Kirill Stremousov died in a car crash near Henichesk on 9 November 2022.

After being reported missing by her husband, on 16 November 2022 Russian media reported that Ekaterina Gubareva, another deputy head of the administration, had been detained by the Russian police in relation to a corruption case involving embezzlement of public funds and suspended from her current position.

Composition 
The military commander and the head of the administration are in charge of the administration, which includes:

Administrative division 
According to the occupation administration, the Kherson Military-Civilian Administration is divided into 5 districts, 49 territorial municipalities, within which there are 298 settlements. Thus, the military-civilian administration includes Kherson Raion, Beryslav Raion, Skadovsk Raion, Kakhovka Raion and Henichesk Raion. In fact, the administrative division of the Kherson Oblast and the division of the military-civilian administration do not have any significant differences, and the military-civilian administration simply copied the division of Ukraine so it retained, among other things, the Ukrainian system of administrative divisions.

Torture and abduction of civilians by Russian forces

Dementiy Bilyi, head of the Kherson regional department of the Committee of Voters of Ukraine, claimed that the Russian security forces were "beating, torturing, and kidnapping" civilians in the Kherson Oblast of Ukraine. He added that eyewitnesses had described "dozens" of arbitrary searches and detentions, resulting in an unknown amount of abducted persons. At least 400 residents had gone missing by 16 March, with the mayor and deputy mayor of the town of Skadovsk being allegedly abducted by armed men. An allegedly leaked letter described Russian plans to unleash a "great terror" to suppress protests occurring in Kherson, stating that people would "have to be taken from their homes in the middle of the night".

Ukrainians who escaped from occupied Kherson into Ukrainian-controlled territory provided testimonies of torture, abuse and kidnapping by Russian forces in the region. One person, from Bilozerka in Kherson Oblast, provided physical evidence of being tortured by Russians and described beatings, electrocutions, mock executions, strangulations, threats to kill family members and other forms of torture.

An investigation by BBC News gathered evidence of torture, which in addition to beatings also included electrocution and burns on people's hands and feet. A doctor who treated victims of torture in the region reported: "Some of the worst were burn marks on genitals, a gunshot wound to the head of a girl who was raped and burns from an iron on a patient's back and stomach. A patient told me two wires from a car battery were attached to his groin and he was told to stand on a wet rag". In addition to the BBC, Human Rights Watch and the United Nations Human Rights Monitoring Mission in Ukraine have reported on torture and disappearances carried out by Russian occupation forces in the region. One resident stated: "In Kherson, now people go missing all the time (...) there is a war going on, only this part is without bombs."

Kherson's elected Ukrainian mayor compiled a list of more than 300 people who had been kidnapped by Russian forces as of 15 May 2022. According to The Times, in the building housing the Russian occupation authorities, the screams of the tortured can be frequently heard throughout the corridors.

According to The Washington Post, by 15 April 824 graves had been dug at Kherson's cemetery.

On 22 July 2022, Human Rights Watch reported that Russian forces had tortured, unlawfully detained, and forcibly disappeared civilians in the occupied areas of Kherson and Zaporizhzhia regions. The purpose of the abuse seemed to be to obtain information and to instil fear so that people would accept the occupation, as Russia seeks to assert sovereignty over occupied territory in violation of international law.

Resistance to occupation 

According to Nezavisimaya Gazeta, the activities of the Russian-installed Salvation Committee for Peace and Order encounter constant resistance among the population, and a number of its members were killed by Chief Directorate of Intelligence (GUR) or Ukrainian partisans. Newsweek also reports that two local high-profile pro-Russian figures were shot dead in Kherson by the Ukrainian resistance.

On 5 March, residents of Kherson went to a rally with Ukrainian flags and chanted that the city is still Ukrainian and will never be Russian, despite Russian occupation. The Russian military opened warning fire against the protesters. At the same time, the National Police of Ukraine published a video where a Kherson police officer, holding a Ukrainian flag in his hands, jumped onto a Russian armored personnel carrier that was driving past the rally, and local residents supported his action with shouts and applause.

On 7 March, the Kherson Regional Prosecutor's Office of Ukraine, on the basis of Part 2 of Article 438 of the Criminal Code of Ukraine (violation of the laws and customs of war, associated with premeditated murder), opened a criminal case into the death of several protesters in Nova Kakhovka. According to the investigation, during a rally on 6 March, the Russian military opened fire on protesters indiscriminately "despite the fact that people were unarmed and did not pose any threat," resulting in at least one death and seven injuries.

On 20 March, protesters in Kherson confronted several Russian military vehicles and told them to "go home". New rallies against the occupation happened on 11 and 27 April, both of which were violently dispersed by Russian occupation forces and separatist militias, killing four people in the process. The Woodrow Wilson International Center for Scholars reports that medical workers in Kherson refused to go to work, in order to boycott Russian occupation forces and not treat their injured.

On 20 April, regional media from Odessa reported that pro-Russian blogger Valery Kuleshov had been killed by Ukrainian partisans in Kherson.

On 6 August, deputy head of the Russian administration in Nova Kakhovka, Vitaly Gura, was shot dead in his home. In September 2022, information emerged that Gura's assassination had been faked by the FSB.

Ukrainian counteroffensive and liberation

On 23 April 2022, Ukraine's Ministry of Defence claimed a strike on a Russian 49th Combined Arms Army command post near Kherson, saying it killed two generals and critically injured one. The names of the generals were not released.

On 24 April 2022, the Ukrainian Operational Command South reported that the Ukrainian army had liberated eight settlements in Kherson Oblast.

On 27 April 2022, the Ukrainian Air Force struck the Kherson TV Tower with a missile temporarily forcing Russian television off-air.

On 10 July, Iryna Vereshchuk, the Deputy Prime Minister of Ukraine urged civilians in the Kherson region to evacuate ahead of a future Ukrainian counterattack.

On 27 July 2022 the surface of a section of the Antonivka Road Bridge was rendered unusable for heavy equipment, by M142 HIMARS attacks.

On 4 September 2022, president Zelenskyy announced the liberation of two villages in Kherson Oblast. Ukrainian authorities released a photo showing the raising of the Ukrainian flag in Vysokopillia by Ukrainian forces.

On 6 September 2022, Ukraine confirmed reports that the villages of Liubymivka and Novovoskresenske, southeast of Vysokopillia, had been recaptured by the AFU.

In early October 2022, the Russian defensive lines in the northern parts of the oblast collapsed, and Ukraine successfully recaptured about 1,200 km2 of territory.

In November 2022, Ukrainian forces took back the city of Kherson. Following the loss of Kherson in November 2022, the Russian occupation force moved its temporary administrative centre to Henichesk, whilst retaining its claim to Kherson as the official capital.

Control of settlements

See also

 Russian-occupied territories of Ukraine
 Russian occupation of Crimea
 Russian occupation of Chernihiv Oblast
 Russian occupation of Donetsk Oblast
 Russian occupation of Kharkiv Oblast
 Russian occupation of Kyiv Oblast
 Russian occupation of Luhansk Oblast
 Russian occupation of Mykolaiv Oblast
 Russian occupation of Sumy Oblast
 Russian occupation of Zaporizhzhia Oblast
 Russian occupation of Zhytomyr Oblast
 Snake Island during the 2022 Russian invasion of Ukraine
 Annexation of Crimea by the Russian Federation
 Russian annexation of Donetsk, Kherson, Luhansk and Zaporizhzhia oblasts
 2022 protests in Russian-occupied Ukraine
 Ukrainian resistance during the 2022 Russian invasion of Ukraine

Notes

References

Further reading
 

Kherson
Kherson military-civilian administration
Southern Ukraine campaign
April 2022 events in Ukraine
Kherson
History of Kherson Oblast